Embo railway station formerly served the town of Embo in Sutherland, Scotland.

History
The station was opened in 1902. James Craig, formerly at Dalcross railway station was appointed the first agent of the company.

The station was on the Dornoch Light Railway, a branch railway which was later incorporated into the London, Midland and Scottish Railway (in 1923) and the Scottish Region of British Railways in 1948.

The station closed on 13 June 1960.

Other stations on the branch line
 The Mound - junction - line still open.
 
 Skelbo
 Dornoch

See also 
 List of closed railway stations in Britain

References

External links
 Disused stations
 Embo station on navigable 1947 map

Disused railway stations in Sutherland
Former Highland Railway stations
Railway stations in Great Britain opened in 1902
Railway stations in Great Britain closed in 1960